A Chuvash is a member of the Chuvash people, an ethnic group living in Russia.

Leaders and politicians 

Vakrim (15th century) - Chuvash noble who left Golden Horde to become a vassal of Vasily the Blind.
Mĕtri Căvaš (16th century) - hero of the siege of Kazan. Descendant of mărsa Vakrim, ancestor of Gavrila Derzhavin.
Kamaj (16th century) - Chuvash mărsa at the service of Khan of Kazan who defected to the Russian side.
Aransajpik (17th century) - Chuvash noble at Russian service who was granted 300 desiatinas of land around Şĕrpü (Tsivilsk).
Daniil Elmen (1885–1932) - Chuvash statesman, first leader of Chuvash autonomy in Soviet Russia.
Nikolay Fyodorov (b. 1958) - former president of Chuvashia.

Military figures 
Iskej Pajtulĕ (17th century) - Chuvash poet, ataman (colonel) in the army of Stenka Razin.

Religious figures 
Valĕm Huşa (12th century) - Volga Bulgar Muslim saint, highly revered by Chuvashes.
Mehmet Huşa Celepi (16th century) - Chuvash convert to Islam, hajji (religious pilgrim) and scholar.
Nikita Bichurin (1777–1853) - Christian archimandrite, orientalist. (perhaps quarter-Chuvash)

Academic figures

Educators 
 Ivan Yakovlev (1848–1930) - Chuvash patriarch, inventor of modern Chuvash alphabet.
 Gennady Volkov (1927–2010) - Chuvash educator, Academician of the Russian Academy of Education, founder of the ethnopedagogics.

Linguists 

Atner Husankaj (b. 1948) - linguist and philologist, first president of Chuvash National Congress. Son of poet Petĕr Husankaj.

Journalists 
Nikolai Yut - Chuvash writer, folklorist and literary critic.

Cultural figures

Actors and actresses 
Tany Youne (1903–1977) - first Chuvash theater actress, the first Chuvash film actress.
Boris Markov - actor, famous music director, People's Artist of the Russia and Chuvash ASSR.

Architects 
Pyotr Yegorov (1731–1789) - author of the railing of Summer Garden.

Ballet dancers 
Nadezhda Pavlova (b. 1956) - famous ballet dancer, People's Artist of the USSR.

Musicians 
Alexey Aygi (b. 1971) - musician, son of Gennady Aygi.
Elina Nechayeva - musician

Painters 
Aleksey Kokel (1880–1956) - painter  
Nikolai Ovchinnikov (1918–2004) - People's Painter of the RSFSR and Chuvashia.
Praski Vitti (b. 1936) - Chuvash painter and illustrator.

Sculptors 
Gerasim Pileš (1913–1994) - writer, playwright, sculptor and graphicist.

Writers and poets 

Emine (19th century) - most famous Chuvash woman poet.
Kĕştenttin Ivanov (1890–1915) - outstanding poet, author of "Narspi".
Mišši Śeśpĕl (1899–1922) - pioneer of Chuvash syllabotonic poetry.
Dimitri Isayev (1905–1930) - prolific writer and literary critic.
Ille Tuktaš (1907–1957) - Chuvash writer, poet and folklorist, author of the anthem of Chuvashia.
Anat Serep (1920–2003) - World War II veteran, writer.
Alexander Artemiev (1924–1998) - people's poet, writer and translator.
Arkady Malov (1928–1995) - Chuvash writer, journalist and translator.
Gennady Aygi (1934–2006) - famous poet and translator, father of Russian surrealist poetry.
Boris Căntăk (b. 1960) - talented writer, playwright and poet.
Vasley Mitta (1908–1957) - poet and translator.
Nikifor Mran'ka (1901–1973) - poet and dramatist
Lyudmila Vasilyeva (1930–1949) - poet
Marina Karyagina (b. 1969) - poet

Other figures

Cosmonauts 
Andriyan Nikolayev (1929–2004) - third Soviet cosmonaut, fifth man in space.

Sportspersons 
Svetlana Chirkova-Lozovaya (b. 1945) - fencer, two times olympic champion in foil team competition (1968 Summer Olympics in Mexico City and 1972 Summer Olympics in Munich).
Veronika Chumikova
Olimpiada Ivanova (b. 1970) - race walker, silver medalist of 2004 Summer Olympics in Athens.
Irina Kalentyeva (b. 1977) - professional mountain bike racer, bronze medalist of 2008 Summer Olympics in Beijing.

See also 
 Chuvash Wikipedia
 ChuvashTet
 Chuvash National Museum
 Society for the study of the native land
 Chuvash National Congress

Chuvashes